Dolenja Vas is a settlement in the Municipality of Železniki in the Upper Carniola region of Slovenia.

References

External links 

Dolenja Vas at Geopedia

Populated places in the Municipality of Železniki